Sir Kenneth Anthony Bradshaw  (1 September 1922 – 31 October 2007) was Clerk of the House of Commons in the United Kingdom from 1983 to 1987.

He was educated at Ampleforth College, then St Catharine's College, Cambridge.

References

Ampleforth OA obituary

1922 births
2007 deaths
English constitutionalists
Knights Commander of the Order of the Bath
Alumni of St Catharine's College, Cambridge
People educated at Ampleforth College
Clerks of the House of Commons
Place of birth missing
Place of death missing